Mieke may refer to:

 Mieke (given name), a list of people with the given name
 Mieke Telkamp, Dutch singer Maria Telgenkamp (1934–2016)
 Mieke (character), a fictional character from comic album series Yoko Tsuno
 Mieke Schmidt, a fictional character in EuroTrip, a 2004 American comedy film
 1753 Mieke, a main-belt asteroid

See also
Meike (disambiguation)